The Flight of the Wild Gander: Explorations in the Mythological Dimension is a 1969 book by mythologist Joseph Campbell, in which he collects a number of his early essays and forwards. Essays include "Bios and Mythos" (on the psycho-biological sources of mythic forms and symbols), "Mythogenesis" (on the rise and fall of a single Native American legend) and "The Symbol without Meaning" (about the secularization of myths in the modern age).

The wild gander of the title is a reference to the Hindu concept of the  paramahamsa, a great spiritual teacher of exalted illumination, able to transcend the mundane, just as the hamsa is able to fly above the sky-scraping Himalayas.

Published originally in 1969 by Viking Press, the book was rereleased by Harper and Row in 1990. The third edition was published by New World Library in 2002, making The Flight of the Wild Gander the third title in the Joseph Campbell Foundation's Collected Works of Joseph Campbell series.

References

External links
 Flight of the Wild Gander page on the JCF site

Books by Joseph Campbell
Comparative mythology
1969 books
Mythology books
Psychology books
Anthropology books
Essay collections
Viking Press books